Ka-Ha-Si or Duk-Toothl ("Black Skin") is a character in the mythology of the Tsimshian and Tlingit peoples of the Pacific Northwest Coast of North America.

References 

 
 
 

Tsimshian mythology
Tlingit mythology